The following are lists of all Olympic venues, starting with the first modern Olympic Games in 1896, organized alphabetically, by sport, and by year.

As a multi-sport event, competitions held during a given Olympics usually take place in different venues located across the host city and its metropolitan area. However, some Olympic competitions may be held outside the host metropolitan area, and instead in other regions of the host country (as it is usually the case with Football at the Summer Olympics and its requirements for large stadia).

One venue is designated as the "Olympic Stadium", the big centrepiece stadium of the games. Traditionally at the Summer Olympic Games, the opening and closing ceremonies and the Athletics competitions are held in the Olympic Stadium. The Winter Olympic Games do not usually have a central Olympic Stadium, but instead have edifices that are designated as the Olympic Stadium to host the opening and closing ceremonies.

Summer Olympics

Alphabetical

Sport
Current for 2016

Discontinued sports

Demonstration sports

Games by year

Winter Olympics

Alphabetical

Sport
Current for 2014

Demonstration sports

Games by year

See also

List of Commonwealth Games venues

References
LA84Foundation.org site on the Official Olympic reports: 1896 Athens to 2006 Turin. Accessed 25 February 2011.
Sports-reference.com profile of the Olympics. Accessed 25 February 2011. It lists all of the events with locations for each event.
Beijing2008.cn profile. Accessed 25 February 2011. 
Olympic.org profile of the 2010 Winter Olympics in Vancouver. Accessed 25 February 2011.
London2012.com venue profile. Accessed 25 February 2011.
Sochi2014.com list of venues. Accessed 25 February 2011.
Rio2016.org map of the venues. Accessed 25 February 2011.

Venues